Tswana is an indigenous beef cattle breed of Botswana. It is a Sanga type, similar to Barotse and Tuli. Its colour is plain  black or multi coloured: usually red pied, and rarely black pied. The breed can also be found in South Africa. Animals of this breed are well adapted to hot, dry environments and have a high level of tick and heat tolerance.

External links
 Cattle Breeds

Cattle breeds
Animal breeds originating in Botswana